George Paul Miller (January 15, 1891 – December 29, 1982) was an American veteran of World War I who served 14 terms as a U.S. Representative from California from 1945 to 1973.

Early life
George Paul Miller was born in San Francisco, California on January 15, 1891. His father was a dredger captain on the Sacramento River. Miller attended public and private schools. He graduated from Saint Mary's College of California in 1912 with a degree in civil engineering.

Career

Early career
Miller worked as a civil engineer from 1912 to 1917. During the First World War, he served as a lieutenant in the 36th Infantry Division and 346th Field Artillery from 1917 to 1919. After serving as member of the United States Veterans' Bureau from 1921 to 1925, Miller resumed activities as a civil engineer. He was also co-owner of a travel agency in San Francisco, but it failed during the Great Depression. He was a street sweeper in Alameda during the depression.

Political career
He volunteered in the drive to repeal Prohibition and was elected president of the Alameda County Non-partisan League, a group advocating for the consolidation of Oakland County and Alameda County after the formation of San Francisco's government. He then served as member of the California State Assembly from 1937 to 1941. Miller then ran for a seat on the Alameda County Board of Supervisors, but was unsuccessful. He was executive secretary to the California Division of Fish and Game from 1942 to 1944.

Miller was elected as a Democrat to the Seventy-ninth and to the thirteen succeeding Congresses (January 3, 1945 – January 3, 1973). He served as chairman of the Oceanography Committee, a subcommittee of the Merchant Marine and Fisheries Committee. He later served as chairman of the Committee on Science and Astronautics (Eighty-seventh through Ninety-second Congresses), after the death of Overton Brooks in 1961. He was an unsuccessful candidate for renomination in 1972 to the Ninety-third Congress, defeated in the Democratic primary by Pete Stark.

He was an early supporter for the development of solar power systems.

Personal life
Miller married Esther M. Perkins of Overton, Nebraska in 1927. They had one daughter: Ann.

Death
Miller was a resident of Alameda, California, until his death there on December 29, 1982. He was interred in San Francisco National Cemetery in the Presidio of San Francisco, California.

Legacy
The George Miller Memorial Scholarship at Saint Mary's College and the George P. Miller Fund for Special Education at the Alameda Unified School District were established in his honor.

References

External links

1891 births
1982 deaths
Saint Mary's College of California alumni
Democratic Party members of the United States House of Representatives from California
Democratic Party members of the California State Assembly
United States Army officers
Politicians from San Francisco
Politicians from Alameda, California
San Francisco Bay Area politicians
20th-century American politicians
Military personnel from California